Mohammad Ahmadpouri (born September 21, 1979) is an Iranian football midfielder who currently plays for Zob Ahan in the Iran Pro League.

Club career

In 2009, Ahmadpouri joined Shahin Bushehr after spending the previous two years at Shirin Faraz F.C.

Club career statistics
Last Update  21 September 2011 

 Assist Goals

References

1979 births
Living people
Iranian footballers
Association football midfielders
Shahin Bushehr F.C. players
Tractor S.C. players
Shirin Faraz Kermanshah players
Zob Ahan Esfahan F.C. players
People from Masjed Soleyman
Sportspeople from Khuzestan province
21st-century Iranian people